Fuji is a 1974 American animated short by Robert Breer.

Summary
The film explores the director's artistic rendition of a train ride past Japan's Mount Fuji, using line drawings, rotoscope and live action.

Reception and legacy
In 2002, Fuji was selected for preservation in the United States National Film Registry by the Library of Congress as being "culturally, historically, or aesthetically significant". It is part of Anthology Film Archives' Essential Cinema Repertory collection.

See also
Experimental film
Bullet train

External links 
 
 Fuji essay by Daniel Eagan in America's Film Legacy: The Authoritative Guide to the Landmark Movies in the National Film Registry, A&C Black, 2010 , pages 714-715
Fuji on MUBI

References

1974 films
Animated films without speech
Collage film
Mount Fuji
United States National Film Registry films
Rail transport films
1974 animated films
Films set in Japan
Japan in non-Japanese culture